The Best of the Specials & Fun Boy Three is an album by Neville Staple comprising new recordings of the greatest hits of The Specials and Fun Boy Three, released in 2006.  The album is simply a reprint of the 2000 album Ghost Town - 13 Hits of The Specials and Fun Boy Three, which had already been reissued as The Very Best of The Specials and Fun Boy Three.

Track listing
"Our Lips Are Sealed"
"Man at C&A"
"A Message to You Rudy"
"Rude Boys Outa Jail"
"Leave It Out"
"You're Wondering Now"
"Running Away"
"Ghost Town"
"T'Ain't What You Do It's the Way That You Do It"
"It's You"
"Gangsters"
"The Lunatics (Have Taken Over the Asylum)"
"Too Hot"
"Ghost Town" (Chemical Submission Mix)
"Our Lips Are Sealed"

2006 compilation albums
Fun Boy Three albums
The Specials compilation albums